The following is an alphabetical list of articles related to the U.S. state of Missouri.

0–9 

.mo.us – Internet second-level domain for the state of Missouri
24th state to join the United States of America

A
Adjacent states:   (one of only two states with eight neighboring states)

Agriculture in Missouri
Airports in Missouri
Alcohol laws of Missouri
Amusement parks in Missouri
Arboreta in Missouri
commons:Category:Arboreta in Missouri
Archaeology of Missouri
:Category:Archaeological sites in Missouri
commons:Category:Archaeological sites in Missouri
Architecture of Missouri
Art museums and galleries in Missouri
commons:Category:Art museums and galleries in Missouri
Astronomical observatories in Missouri
commons:Category:Astronomical observatories in Missouri
Attorney General of the State of Missouri

B
Botanical gardens in Missouri
commons:Category:Botanical gardens in Missouri
Buildings and structures in Missouri
commons:Category:Buildings and structures in Missouri

C

Capital of the state of Missouri
Capital punishment in Missouri
Capitol of the State of Missouri
commons:Category:Missouri State Capitol
Casinos in Missouri
Caves of Missouri
commons:Category:Caves of Missouri
Children's Education Alliance of Missouri
Census statistical areas of Missouri
Cities in Missouri
commons:Category:Cities in Missouri
Climate of Missouri
:Category:Climate of Missouri
Climate change in Missouri
commons:Category:Climate of Missouri
Colleges and universities in Missouri
commons:Category:Universities and colleges in Missouri

Columbia, Missouri
Communications in Missouri
commons:Category:Communications in Missouri
Companies in Missouri
Congressional districts of Missouri
Constitution of the State of Missouri
Convention centers in Missouri
commons:Category:Convention centers in Missouri
Counties of the state of Missouri
commons:Category:Counties in Missouri
Culture of Missouri
commons:Category:Missouri culture

D
Democratic Party of Missouri
Demographics of Missouri

E
Economy of Missouri
:Category:Economy of Missouri
commons:Category:Economy of Missouri
Education in Missouri
:Category:Education in Missouri
commons:Category:Education in Missouri
Elections in the state of Missouri
:Category:Missouri elections
commons:Category:Missouri elections
Environment of Missouri
commons:Category:Environment of Missouri

F

Festivals in Missouri
commons:Category:Festivals in Missouri
Flag of the state of Missouri
Forts in Missouri
:Category:Forts in Missouri
commons:Category:Forts in Missouri

G

Geography of Missouri
Grand Divide
:Category:Geography of Missouri
commons:Category:Geography of Missouri
Geology of Missouri
commons:Category:Geology of Missouri
Ghost towns in Missouri
:Category:Ghost towns in Missouri
commons:Category:Ghost towns in Missouri
Golf clubs and courses in Missouri
Government of the state of Missouri  website
:Category:Government of Missouri
commons:Category:Government of Missouri
Governor of the state of Missouri
List of governors of Missouri
Great Seal of the State of Missouri

H
Henry Shaw Ozark Corridor
Heritage railroads in Missouri
commons:Category:Heritage railroads in Missouri
High schools of Missouri
Higher education in Missouri
Missouri State Highway System
Hiking trails in Missouri
commons:Category:Hiking trails in Missouri
Historic houses in Missouri
History of Missouri
Historical outline of Missouri
Hospitals in Missouri
House of Representatives of the State of Missouri

I
Images of Missouri
commons:Category:Missouri

J
Jefferson City, Missouri, state capital since 1826

K
Kansas City, Missouri

L
Lakes of Missouri
commons:Category:Lakes of Missouri
Landmarks in Missouri
commons:Category:Landmarks in Missouri
Libertarian Party of Missouri
Lieutenant governor of the state of Missouri
Lists related to the state of Missouri:
List of airports in Missouri
List of census statistical areas in Missouri
List of cities in Missouri
List of colleges and universities in Missouri
List of United States congressional districts in Missouri
List of counties in Missouri
List of forts in Missouri
List of ghost towns in Missouri
List of governors of Missouri
List of high schools in Missouri
List of Interstate Highways in Missouri
List of historic houses in Missouri
List of hospitals in Missouri
List of individuals executed in Missouri
List of law enforcement agencies in Missouri
List of museums in Missouri
List of National Historic Landmarks in Missouri
List of newspapers in Missouri
List of people from Missouri
List of radio stations in Missouri
List of railroads in Missouri
List of Registered Historic Places in Missouri
List of rivers of Missouri
List of school districts in Missouri
List of snakes in Missouri
List of state forests in Missouri
List of state highways in Missouri
List of state parks in Missouri
List of state prisons in Missouri
List of symbols of the state of Missouri
List of television stations in Missouri
List of U.S. Routes in Missouri
List of United States congressional delegations from Missouri
List of United States congressional districts in Missouri
List of United States representatives from Missouri
List of United States senators from Missouri
Louisiana Purchase of 1803

M
Maps of Missouri
commons:Category:Maps of Missouri
Mass media in Missouri
Mississippi River
Missouri  website
:Category:Missouri
commons:Category:Missouri
Missouri Crematory
Missouri Day
Missouri First Steps
Missouri Foundation for Health
Missouri League of Women Voters
Missouri Nation (Native American)
Missouri Pacific Railroad
Missouri River
Missouri Compromise
Missouri River 340
Missouri State Capitol
Missouri State Highway Patrol
Missouri State League
Missouri Wall of Fame
Missourians for Equality
MO – United States Postal Service postal code for the state of Missouri
Monuments and memorials in Missouri
commons:Category:Monuments and memorials in Missouri
Mountains of Missouri
commons:Category:Mountains of Missouri
Museums in Missouri
:Category:Museums in Missouri
commons:Category:Museums in Missouri
Music of Missouri
commons:Category:Music of Missouri
:Category:Musical groups from Missouri
:Category:Musicians from Missouri

N
National Forests of Missouri
commons:Category:National Forests of Missouri
Natural history of Missouri
commons:Category:Natural history of Missouri
Newspapers of Missouri

O
Outdoor sculptures in Missouri
commons:Category:Outdoor sculptures in Missouri

P
People from Missouri
:Category:People from Missouri
commons:Category:People from Missouri
:Category:People by city in Missouri
:Category:People by county in Missouri
:Category:People from Missouri by occupation
Politics of Missouri
commons:Category:Politics of Missouri
Libertarian Party of Missouri
Missouri Democratic Party
Missouri Republican Party
Socialist Party of Missouri
Protected areas of Missouri
commons:Category:Protected areas of Missouri

Q

R
Radio stations in Missouri
Railroad museums in Missouri
commons:Category:Railroad museums in Missouri
Railroads in Missouri
Registered historic places in Missouri
commons:Category:Registered Historic Places in Missouri
Religion in Missouri
:Category:Religion in Missouri
commons:Category:Religion in Missouri
Republican Party of Missouri
Rivers of Missouri
Mississippi River
Missouri River
commons:Category:Rivers of Missouri
Rock formations in Missouri
commons:Category:Rock formations in Missouri
Roller coasters in Missouri
commons:Category:Roller coasters in Missouri

S
St. Charles, Missouri, first state capital 1821-1826
St. Louis, capital of the District of Louisiana 1804–1805, capital of the Territory of Louisiana 1805–1812, capital of the Territory of Missouri 1812-1821
previously as Saint-Louis, capital of la Haute-Louisiane 1800-1803
previously as San Luis, capital of Alta Louisiana 1765-1800
School districts of Missouri
Scouting in Missouri
Senate of the State of Missouri
Settlements in Missouri
Cities in Missouri
Towns in Missouri
Villages in Missouri
Townships in Missouri
Census Designated Places in Missouri
Other unincorporated communities in Missouri
List of ghost towns in Missouri
Socialist Party of Missouri
Sports in Missouri
:Category:Sports in Missouri
commons:Category:Sports in Missouri
:Category:Sports venues in Missouri
commons:Category:Sports venues in Missouri
State Capitol of Missouri
State Highway Patrol of Missouri
State of Missouri  website
Constitution of the State of Missouri
Government of the state of Missouri
:Category:Government of Missouri
commons:Category:Government of Missouri
Executive branch of the government of the state of Missouri
Governor of the state of Missouri
Legislative branch of the government of the state of Missouri
Legislature of the State of Missouri
Senate of the State of Missouri
House of Representatives of the State of Missouri
Judicial branch of the government of the state of Missouri
Supreme Court of the State of Missouri
State parks of Missouri
commons:Category:State parks of Missouri
State prisons of Missouri
Structures in Missouri
commons:Category:Buildings and structures in Missouri
Supreme Court of the State of Missouri
Symbols of the state of Missouri
:Category:Symbols of Missouri
commons:Category:Symbols of Missouri

T
Telecommunications in Missouri
commons:Category:Communications in Missouri
Telephone area codes in Missouri
Television shows set in Missouri
Television stations in Missouri
Territory of Missouri
Theatres in Missouri
commons:Category:Theatres in Missouri
Tourism in Missouri  website
commons:Category:Tourism in Missouri
Transportation in Missouri
:Category:Transportation in Missouri
commons:Category:Transport in Missouri

U
United States of America
States of the United States of America
United States census statistical areas of Missouri
United States congressional delegations from Missouri
United States congressional districts in Missouri
United States Court of Appeals for the Eighth Circuit
United States District Court for the Eastern District of Missouri
United States District Court for the Western District of Missouri
United States representatives from Missouri
United States senators from Missouri
Universities and colleges in Missouri
commons:Category:Universities and colleges in Missouri
University of Missouri
commons:Category:University of Missouri
US-MO – ISO 3166-2:US region code for the State of Missouri

V

W
Water parks in Missouri
Wikimedia
Wikimedia Commons:Category:Missouri
commons:Category:Maps of Missouri
Wikinews:Category:Missouri
Wikinews:Portal:Missouri
Wikipedia Category:Missouri
Wikipedia Portal:Missouri
Wikipedia:WikiProject Missouri
:Category:WikiProject Missouri articles
:Category:WikiProject Missouri

X

Y

Z
Zoos in Missouri
commons:Category:Zoos in Missouri

See also

Topic overview:
Missouri
Outline of Missouri

 
 
Missouri